The Willy Brandt Prize is an annual prize awarded by the Norwegian-German Willy Brandt prize foundation (in German: Norwegisch-Deutsche Willy-Brandt-Stiftung) since 2000. It is awarded to persons or institutions that make significant contributions to German-Norwegian relations. It is named after the former German Bundeskanzler Willy Brandt and comprises a Willy Brandt statuette by Nils Aas and a certificate. It is separate from the International Willy-Brandt Prize founded in 2011 by the Social Democratic Party of Germany.

Prize winners

2018
 Robin Allers
 Kate Hansen Bundt

2017
 Ingrid Brekke
 sailing ship Thor Heyerdahl e.V.

2016
 Jon Fosse
 Julia Stöber

2015
 Sten Inge Jørgensen, Norwegian journalist writing for Morgenbladet and author of the book "Tyskland stiger frem"
 Clemens Bomsdorf, German journalist writing for Focus, The Art Newspaper, art – Das Kunstmagazin

2014
 Jan Garbarek, Norwegian Saxophonist
 Edvard-Munch-Haus e.V.

2013
 Jonas Gahr Støre, former Norwegian Foreign Minister
 Frank-Walter Steinmeier, former German Foreign Minister

2012
 Ingvar Ambjørnsen, Norwegian writer
 Action Reconciliation Service for Peace, a German organisation

2011
 Therese Bjørneboe, Norwegian journalist
 Jörn Thiede, German polar scientist

2010
 Sverre Dahl, Norwegian translator
 Klaus-Ewald Holst, Honorary Consul General for Norway in Sachsen-Anhalt, Thüringen and Brandenburg

2009
 Inge Lønning, Norwegian professor and politician
 Fritz Fadranski, German historian

2008
 Grete Lächert, Music teacher
 Hannelore Besser, School principal

2007
Egon Bahr, German politician
Thorvald Stoltenberg, former Norwegian Foreign Minister

2006
Gymnasium Carolinum (Neustrelitz), Neustrelitz, a German academic school
Stor-Elvdal ungdomsskole, Koppang, a Norwegian academy
Herzog-Johann-Gymnasium in Simmern, Hunsrück, a German academic school

2005
Björn Engholm (German), former Minister-President for Schleswig-Holstein
Kåre Willoch (Norwegian), former Prime Minister of Norway

2004
Jostein Gaarder, Norwegian writer
Heiko Uecker, German professor

2003
Nils Morten Udgaard, Norwegian journalist
Einhard Lorenz, German historian

2002
Wencke Myhre, Norwegian singer
Horst Tappert, German actor

2001
Klaus Liesen, former Director-General of Ruhrgas AG
Olav Christopher Jensen, German-Norwegian visual artist

2000
Jahn Otto Johansen, journalist
Gabriele Haefs, translator for the book Sofies Welt (English: Sophie's World)

External links 
 Der Willy-Brandt-Preis

References

Politics awards
Foreign relations of Germany
Willy Brandt